Plasmopara penniseti is a plant pathogen infecting pearl millet.

References

Water mould plant pathogens and diseases
Pearl millet diseases
Peronosporales